Johnston Creek is a tributary of the Bow River in Canada's Rocky Mountains. The creek is located in Banff National Park.

Course
The creek flows southeast between Helena Ridge and the Sawback Range, and then south through a gorge known as Johnston Canyon.

Johnston Canyon

As Johnston Creek approaches the Bow River, it flows through a large canyon formed by erosion over thousands of years. The creek has cut through the limestone rock to form sheer canyon walls, as well as waterfalls, tunnels, and pools.

A popular hiking trail follows the canyon and leads to a meadow within the Johnston Valley above the canyon. The first part of the trail consists of a constructed walkway with safety rails and bridges, while the last part of the trail is natural and more rugged. Within the meadow are the Ink Pots, which are six blue-green spring-fed pools. In August 2018, a few of the "natural" trails near the falls were closed off, in an attempt to help recover the small nesting population of the American black swift.

Ice climbing is a popular activity on the frozen waterfalls in winter.

A tourist lodge and large parking area is located at the foot of the canyon, close to the creek mouth, along the Bow Valley Parkway (Highway 1A).

Gallery

See also
 List of rivers of Alberta

References

 Patton, B and Robinson, B. The Canadian Rockies Trail Guide. Devil's Head Press Ltd. Canmore. 1978.

External links

Banff.com - Johnston Canyon
Johnston Canyon Trail to Ink Pots

Rivers of Alberta
Banff National Park
Bow River